Billie Jean Horton (née Jones; born June 6, 1933) is an American country-music singer-songwriter and former music promoter who is best known for her high profile marriages, first to iconic country musician and singer-songwriter Hank Williams in 1952 until 1953 and subsequently to singer Johnny Horton from 1953 until 1960.

Biography
Horton was the daughter of a police chief from Bossier City, Louisiana. She divorced her first husband Harrison Eshleman when she was introduced to Hank Williams by her then-boyfriend, country singer Faron Young. They married in a private ceremony in Minden, Louisiana, on October 18, 1952, then repeated their vows before sold-out audiences at two Williams concerts at the Baton Rouge High School gymnasium and the Municipal Auditorium in New Orleans, Louisiana. She was 19 years old at the time of her marriage with Williams.

Williams died from heart failure on New Year's Day, 1953, five days before his daughter Jett Williams with Bobbie Jett was born. That September, she married country singer Johnny Horton and became important in promoting his career. They had two daughters, Yanina and Melody, and Horton adopted her daughter Jeri Lynn. Horton died on 5 November 1960, in a traffic collision with a truck, widowing Billie Jean a second time.  She then worked as a recording artist; her record "Ocean of Tears" hit the country top 40 in 1961. She had a relationship with Johnny Cash (while he was still married to his first wife, Vivian Liberto).  Later she married insurance executive Kent Berlin, whom she subsequently divorced.

In 1971, a judge ruled that despite  her divorce from Eshleman not being finalized before her wedding with Williams, she entered the marriage in good faith and thus their union was entitled to a presumption of validity.

Horton became known for her energetic efforts on behalf of the reputations and estates of both of her famous husbands. As of 2016, she resides in an assisted-living facility and her three daughters live in Shreveport.

Film depiction
Horton is portrayed by actress Maddie Hasson in the 2015 biopic film about Hank Williams' life titled I Saw the Light, based on Hank Williams: The Biography.

References

1933 births
Living people
American women country singers
American country singer-songwriters
Music promoters
People from Bossier City, Louisiana
Singer-songwriters from Louisiana
Country musicians from Louisiana
21st-century American women